Byun Jung-il (born 16 November 1968 in Seoul) is a former South Korean professional boxer. He competed in the men's bantamweight event at the 1988 Summer Olympics.

Amateur career 
At the 1988 Seoul Olympics, Byun defeated Jean-Marc Augustin of France in the first round of the bantamweight competition. In the second round, he refused to leave the ring after losing a 4-1 decision to Aleksandar Khristov of Bulgaria. He was penalized two points by New Zealand referee Keith Walker for headbutting. He sat by himself in the ring for over an hour. Eventually, match officials turned the lights out and left him in darkness. Byun's actions were reminiscent of another Korean boxer who staged a lengthy sit-in after being disqualified at the 1964 Tokyo Olympics.

Professional career 
Byun turned professional in 1990 and in 1993 defeated Victor Rabanales for the WBC bantamweight title by decision in his ninth fight. He lost the belt later that year to Yasuei Yakushiji, and lost a rematch to Yakushiji the following year. He retired after the loss.

Professional boxing record

See also
List of bantamweight boxing champions

References

External links

1968 births
Living people
People from Seoul
Sportspeople from Seoul
South Korean male boxers
Olympic boxers of South Korea
Boxers at the 1988 Summer Olympics
Bantamweight boxers
World bantamweight boxing champions
World Boxing Council champions